Pamela Irving (born 1960) is an Australian visual artist specialising in bronze, ceramic and mosaic sculptures as well as printmaking and copper etchings. In addition to her extensive art work, Irving has lectured in art and ceramics at Monash University, the Melbourne College of Advanced Education, the Royal Melbourne Institute of Technology (RMIT) and the Chisholm Institute of Technology. She also worked as an art critic for the Geelong Advertiser and was a councillor on the Craft Council of Victoria.

Education

Born in Victoria, Australia, Irving was formally educated at the Melbourne State College (1979–1982) where she undertook a Bachelor of Education (Art/Craft) and she completed a Master of Arts degree by research at the Melbourne College of Advanced Education. Supervised by Professor Noel John Flood, (ceramicist and the Head of Ceramics Department), Irving was one of the first two candidates to be approved to undertake the Master of Arts Degree in Visual Arts in what was, at that time, the Melbourne CAE.

Irving's thesis for her master's degree examined 'the reasons and meaning behind the presence and mythology imagery in the works of Arthur Boyd, John Perceval and Mirka Mora (those artists being nominated because of the relevance to my own work)'.

Style and influences

Pascoe observes that Irving's work is derived from 'a mixture of personal experience, myth and virulent imagination'. Hammond has described Irving's early ceramic work as 'humorous, figurative and cheerfully contemptuous of pottery traditions.

Irving's early art was influenced by artists including Arthur Boyd, John Brack, Noel Connihan, Mirka Mora, Sidney Nolan and John Perceval. In recent years, Irving has been influenced ″by the honest and direct expressiveness of ‘outsider art’ (the art of self-taught or 'naive artists') and the craft of 'memoryware'″ Significantly, this interest grew following Irving's visit to Nek Chand's Rock Garden in Chandigarh, India.

Notable work

Irving's most famous work is the bronze sculpture of Larry La Trobe, commissioned in 1992 as a part of the Swanston Street redevelopment in Melbourne, and stolen by a thief or thieves unknown during 1995. The resulting media attention rallied significant public support for the recovery of the sculpture. Although never recovered, the statue was recast by the foundry owner, Peter Kolliner, with some minor changes by Irving and was replaced in September 1996. The Larry sculpture is located at the corner of Swanston Street and Collins Street, Melbourne.

Another notable commission is a large mosaic mural covering the Luna Palace building inside Melbourne's Luna Park. This large scale public artwork was commissioned for the centenary of Luna Park and took four years to complete.

Professional associations

Active in mosaic art in Australia, Irving served as a councilor on the Craft Council of Victoria during the 1980s and became vice-president of the Mosaic Association of Australia and New Zealand between 2007 - 2017.

Exhibitions 

Between 1981 and 2018, Irving took part in 27 solo exhibitions, 16 joint exhibitions and more than 100 group exhibitions.

Collections 

Irving's work is held in the following collections:

Museums and galleries

Museum Victoria
Collezione Mosaici Moderni
University of Melbourne including Trinity College
Deakin University
Australian Catholic University
Burnie College of TAFE, Tasmania
Artbank
Melbourne City Council
Shepparton Art Gallery
Bendigo Art Gallery
Colac Otway Shire
Footscray City Art Collection
Geelong Art Gallery
City of Glen Eira
City of Hume
Wangaratta Exhibitions Gallery
City of Whitehorse
City of Wyndham

Corporate and private collections

ANZ Bank
Art Horses Pty Ltd
L’Oreal Australia
Monash Medical Centre, Clayton
Murray Goulburn Co-operative
Northern Hospital
Pacific Shopping Centres
Polypacific
Sushi King
Yooralla Society
Zart Art
Private collections throughout Australia, the US and Hong Kong including that of Germaine Greer, Tuscany

School collections

Abbotsleigh School for Girls, Sydney
Camberwell Grammar School, Melbourne
Corio North High School
Grimwade House, Melbourne Grammar School
Kew High School
Lara Lake Primary School
Lilydale West Primary School
Lowther Hall Anglican Grammar School
Mentone Girls Grammar School, Melbourne
Mentone Grammar School, Melbourne
Merton Hall, Melbourne Girls Grammar School
Methodist Ladies' College (MLC), Melbourne
Scotch College, Melbourne
Star of the Sea College, Gardenvale
Tintern Girls' Grammar School, Melbourne
Wesley College, Melbourne (Elsternwick Campus)

Awards and grants 

1981 Nominated Kamel Kiln Award
1985 Ceramic Prize, City of Box Hill
1985 Ceramic Prize, City of Footscray
1987 Ministry for the Arts and Ministry for Education Artist in Schools Project
1988 Australia Council Grant To Develop a Body of Ceramic Work.
1988 Ministry for Arts and Ministry for Education, Artist in Schools Project
1989 Tasmanian Arts Council Grant-Artist in Residency, Tasmania
1991 Pat Corrigan Artist Grant, N.A.V.A.
1994 Winner, Australia Day Ceramic Award Shepparton Arts Centre.
1995 City of Glen Eira Artist Award
1999 Artist and Designers in Schools Grant, resident artist at Kew High School
2005 Artist in School Grant, Ministry for the Arts and Education
2010 Arts Victoria Grant
2012 Keep Australia Beautiful Award, Community Action for mosaics at Patterson Station, Bentleigh
2015 Cancer Council CEO Awards, Volunteer Group of the Year, Tuxedo Junction Committee
2017 Arts Council Grant, Tasmania

See also
Art of Australia
List of Australian artists
Larry La Trobe

Notes

Further reading 

 Hammond, Victoria., City of Whitehorse collection, Ceramics Art and Perception, No 50, 2002, pp. 80–82.
 Hedger, Michael., 1995, Public sculpture in Australia / Michael Hedger, Craftsman House, G+B Arts International, Roseville East, N.S.W.
 Kinneally, Susan., Pamela Irving: Happy as Larry  - ceramics, mosaics, printmaking, CD-ROM, Susan Kinneally and Pamela Irving, 2008
 McCulloch, Alan, & McCulloch, Susan. & McCulloch, Emily. 2006, The new McCulloch's encyclopedia of Australian art / Alan McCulloch, Susan McCulloch, Emily McCulloch Childs Aus Art Editions in association with The Miegunyah Press, Fitzroy, Vic.
 National Association for the Visual Arts (Australia). 1995, Who's who of Australian visual artists D.W. Thorpe in association with National Association for the Visual Arts, Port Melbourne, Vic.
 Pascoe, Joseph., Pamela Irving: Decade of images, Ceramics; Art and Perception, No 37, 1999, pp. 37–39.

External links

 

1960 births
Living people
20th-century Australian sculptors
Australian women sculptors
20th-century Australian women artists
Australian ceramicists
Artists from Melbourne
Mosaic artists
Victorian College of the Arts alumni
University of Melbourne women
Australian women ceramicists
Academic staff of Monash University
Australian art critics
Australian women art critics
Academic staff of RMIT University